Beeramid may refer to:
Beer can pyramid, a pyramid made of empty cans of beer
Beeramid (Comic), a comic in The Daily Cardinal, a student newspaper for UW-Madison